Craig Michael Braham-Barrett (born 28 June 1988) is a professional footballer who is currently playing as a defender for Tonbridge Angels. Born in England, he represents the Montserrat national football team.

Career
Braham-Barrett began his career with Charlton Athletic before he was released in 2007. He played non-league football with Eastleigh, East Thurrock United and Welling United before joining Peterborough United in October 2008 for a fee of £10,000. He failed to make an impression at London Road and re-entered non-league football with Grays Athletic, Farnborough Town, Havant & Waterlooville, Sutton United before joining Conference Premier side Macclesfield Town in July 2012. After a season at Macclesfield he joined Cheltenham Town on loan in July 2013. He made his Football League debut in a 2–2 draw with Burton Albion on 3 August 2013. He made his transfer permanent on 20 August 2013.

Following Cheltenham's relegation from the football league in 2015, Braham-Barrett joined Ebbsfleet United. He was loaned to Woking, then had two further loan spells at Whitehawk
before signing permanently for Dover Athletic in March 2016. On 14 October of the same year Braham-Barrett re-joined Welling United from Braintree Town on a one-month loan.

On 14 June 2017, Braham-Barrett joined National League South side Chelmsford City. The following May he returned to Welling for his third spell at the club. In the summer of 2019, he signed for National League South side Hemel Hempstead Town. In January 2020 he joined Dartford.

On 18 June 2021, Braham-Barrett joined Tonbridge Angels ahead of the 2021–22 season.

International career
Braham-Barrett is eligible to play for Jamaica and also for Montserrat, who he qualifies for through his grandmother. In March 2015, he was called up to the 2018 FIFA World Cup qualifier against Curaçao for Montserrat, however, he declined the call to focus on his club football with Cheltenham.

In August 2018, Braham-Barrett accepted a call-up for Montserrat. On 8 September 2018, Braham-Barrett played the full 90 minutes in a 2–1 loss against El Salvador.

Career statistics

Honours

Welling United
London Senior Cup (1): 2018–19

References

External links

Profile at UpThePosh!

1988 births
Living people
Footballers from Greenwich
Montserratian footballers
Montserrat international footballers
English footballers
Montserratian people of Jamaican descent
British sportspeople of Jamaican descent
English people of Montserratian descent
English sportspeople of Jamaican descent
Association football defenders
Aveley F.C. players
Dulwich Hamlet F.C. players
Potters Bar Town F.C. players
Eastleigh F.C. players
East Thurrock United F.C. players
Welling United F.C. players
Peterborough United F.C. players
Kettering Town F.C. players
Grays Athletic F.C. players
Farnborough F.C. players
Havant & Waterlooville F.C. players
Sutton United F.C. players
Macclesfield Town F.C. players
Cheltenham Town F.C. players
Ebbsfleet United F.C. players
Woking F.C. players
Whitehawk F.C. players
Dover Athletic F.C. players
Braintree Town F.C. players
Chelmsford City F.C. players
Dartford F.C. players
Tonbridge Angels F.C. players
Black British sportspeople
English Football League players
National League (English football) players